Eurosatory is the largest international defence and security exhibition for land and air-land that is held every two years in the Paris-Nord Villepinte Exhibition Centre, Paris, France. In 2022, it gathered over 1,700 exhibitors and over 62,000 visitors from 150 countries. It is organized by COGES. 

The exhibition is reserved for professionals only.

Description
This exhibition presents products from the entire land and air-land defense and security industries, from raw materials to sub-assemblies and operational systems.

It covers a wide range of products from vehicles (tanks, armored vehicles, trucks) to small arms (guns, missiles, knives) through communications systems, uniforms, logistics services, and also simulation, operational medicine and disaster responses, etc. Security has been a major theme during last exhibitions, with monitoring, alert and emergency responses solutions as well as civil security with the presence of firemen, among other institutions.

The exhibition is the largest of its kind worldwide, with more than 1,500 exhibitors and 57,000 international visitors. It is closed to the general public and reserved for professionals: exhibitions, institutional, government officials, industry professionals, all ranks members of armed and security forces, police and emergency units. Access is prohibited for people under 16. 

There are two parts of the exhibition: indoor and outdoor. A dynamic live demonstration zone has been created to show the in-real use of several devices: vehicles, drones, technical intervention, and others. These demonstrations are organised twice a day and attract about 1,000 visitors.

History
The first event was organised in 1967 by the French military procurement agency at the Camp Satory and gathered 30 exhibitors. All the editions from SATORY I to SATORY X were held there.

The 1992 edition marked a turning point: the exhibition was modified to be pan-European, taking the name EUROSATORY, European Land Defence Exhibition and moved to the Bourget Exhibition Centre.

In 1994, the United States exhibited for the first time, and most participants were from NATO countries. It went fully international in 1996 when manufacturers from the Russian Federation joined the exhibition.

In 2000, Eurosatory became "International Land and Air Defence exhibition".

From 2002, the exhibition was held in the Paris-Nord Villepinte Exhibition Centre.

The 2006 edition gathered 1,083 exhibitors and 48,000 participants, 50% of which were international, according to the official website. According to the same source, 110 official delegations from 71 countries came to the event, including 450 VIPs, and 24 ministers.

The 2008 edition was one of the most successful in the history of the show, with 117 delegations, 52,500 visitors and 1,210 exhibitors. It was held at the Paris-Nord Villepinte Exhibition Centre, with an exhibition space of 125,000m2. A part of the delegations then had a dinner at the Louvre museum.

The 2010, the tenth edition named "International Defence Week" placed emphasis on operational medicine, UASs and ground robots. It was attended by 1,327 exhibitors from 54 countries and 53,566 professional visitors.

The 2012 edition was dedicated to "Land Defense and Security". It placed an emphasis on cybersecurity by organizing the first forum Cyberdef-Cybersec. There were 1,432 exhibitors and 53,480 visitors.

In 2014, the exhibition Eurosatory brought together 1,507 exhibitors from 59 countries, more than 55,700 visitors and 172 Official Delegations. 

In 2016, the exhibition hosted 1,571 exhibitors from 57 countries, 65.5% of which were international. There were 57,024 professional visitors from 140 countries, 212 official delegations with 821 delegates, and 723 journalists from all around the world.

In 2018, Eurosatory presented a number of novelties: the opening of a third exhibition hall, the Eurosatory LAB presenting 65 French and foreign start-ups, the presence of institutions in the live demonstrations (GIGN, French Army, Prefecture de Police inter-services, and more), and a career day. The event had 1,802 exhibitors (65% international), 57,056 visitors including 227 official delegations.

After 4 years of absence due to the health crisis, the 2022 international exhibition for land and air-land defence and security took place from June 13 to 17, 2022. This edition was one of the most significant in the history of the exhibition, in the particular context of conflicts at the gates of Europe. 1,743 companies and 100,000 professionals gathered for the event. There were 250 delegations from 96 countries, senior executives and public and private decision-makers, project leaders. For the first time, the President of France, Emmanuel Macron inaugurated the show.

References

External links
 Exhibition website
 Israel in eurosatory, 2010 
 

Arms fairs
Trade fairs in France